Katrin Ofner (born 5 March 1990) is an Austrian freestyle skier, specializing in ski cross.

Career
Ofner competed at the 2010 Winter Olympics for Austria. She placed 22nd in the qualifying round in ski cross, to advance to the knockout stages. She finished third in her first round heat, failing to advance.

As of April 2013, her best finish at the World Championships is 4th, in 2011.

Ofner made her World Cup debut in January 2008. As of April 2013, she has three World Cup podium finishes, the best a second place, coming at Blue Mountain in 2011/12. Her best World Cup overall finish in ski cross is 7th, in 2011/12.

World Cup podiums

References

External links
  (freestyle)
  (alpine)
 
 
 

1990 births
Living people
Austrian female freestyle skiers
Olympic freestyle skiers of Austria
Freestyle skiers at the 2010 Winter Olympics
Freestyle skiers at the 2014 Winter Olympics
Freestyle skiers at the 2018 Winter Olympics
Freestyle skiers at the 2022 Winter Olympics
Universiade medalists in freestyle skiing
Universiade gold medalists for Austria
Competitors at the 2009 Winter Universiade
Sportspeople from Klagenfurt